The DHBW Mosbach (Baden-Württemberg Cooperative State University Mosbach) is a public institution of higher education in Germany that is part of the Duale Hochschule Baden-Württemberg (DHBW), a network of cooperative colleges in which students alternate periods of academic study with periods of paid professional employment related to their major. Its main campus is in Mosbach and it also maintains locations in Bad Mergentheim and Heilbronn. It was founded in 1980 as Berufsakademie Mosbach and became a member of the newly created DHBW in 2009. It has about 3000 students.

Dual System
A specific characteristic of the cooperative colleges is the tight integration of academic instruction and practical training. Students spend about half of their program at the college and the other half in a private company (such as a technology business or bank) or public institution. Theoretical training at the college and practical work at the company alternate in 3-month blocks. The companies select the students and offer them a salaried contract. At the end of the three-year program, students receive a Bachelor's degree; some also pursue Master's degrees.

Courses
DHBW Mosbach offers the following majors at undergraduate level:

At the School of Technology:

 Angewandte Informatik - applied computer science
 Bauwesen-Fassadentechnik - construction engineering: facade engineering
 Bauwesen-Projektmanagement - construction engineering: project management
 Elektrotechnik - electrical engineering
 Maschinenbau - mechanical engineering
 Maschinenbau-Holztechnik - mechanical engineering: wood technology
 Maschinenbau-Kunststofftechnik - mechanical engineering: plastics technology
 Maschinenbau-Verfahrenstechnik - mechanical engineering: process engineering
 Maschinenbau-Virtual Engineering - mechanical engineering: virtual engineering
 Mechatronik - mechatronics
 Mechatronik-Elektromobilität - mechatronics: electromobility
 Wirtschaftsingenieurwesen - industrial engineering
 Wirtschaftsingenieurwesen-Innovationsmanagement und Produktmanagement - industrial engineering: innovation and product management
 Wirtschaftsingenieurwesen-Internationale Produktion und Logistik - industrial engineering: international logistics and supply chains
 Wirtschaftsingenieurwesen-Internationales Technisches Projektmanagement - industrial engineering: international industrial project management
 Wirtschaftsingenieurwesen-Internationales Technisches Vertriebsmanagement - industrial engineering: international industrial sales management

At the School of Business:

 Bank - banking studies
 BWL-Gesundheitsmanagement - healthcare business management
 BWL-Handel - trade studies
 BWL-Handel-Agrar - agricultural business
 BWL-Handel-Bau, Haustechnik, Elektro - construction and installation business
 BWL-Handel-Holz - timber business
 BWL-Handel-Wohnen - homes business
 BWL-Handel-Technischer Handel - wholesale trade
 BWL-Handel-Controlling - controlling
 BWL-Handel-Marketing - marketing
 BWL-Handel-Warenwirtschaft und Logistik - supply chain management and logistics
 BWL-Industrie - manufacturing business studies
 BWL-International Business - international business
 Onlinemedien - online media studies
 Rechnungswesen Steuern Wirtschaftsrecht - accounting, tax and business law
 Wirtschaftsinformatik - business information technology

External links

Duale Hochschule Baden Württemberg Mosbach

Universities and colleges in Baden-Württemberg
Baden-Württemberg Cooperative State University
1980 establishments in West Germany
Educational institutions established in 1980
Buildings and structures in Neckar-Odenwald-Kreis